Fred Allen (1894–1956) was an American comedian.

Fred Allen or Frederick Allen may also refer to:

Arts and entertainment
Frederick Warren Allen (1888–1961), American sculptor
Fred Allen (film editor) (1896–1955), American film editor
Fred Allen (set designer) (1942–2007), Canadian set designer and artist

Politics and law
Fred E. Allen (1855–1935), American merchant and member of the New York State Assembly
Frederick Hobbes Allen (1858–1937), American lawyer and soldier
Fred J. Allen (1865–1917), American politician and lawyer
Frederick Allen (Maine politician) (1914–2001), American politician from Maine
Frederic W. Allen (1926–2016), American jurist, Chief Justice of the Vermont Supreme Court
Fred Allen (Arkansas politician) (fl. 2000s–2010s), American politician in the Arkansas House of Representatives

Sports
Frederick W. Allen (1844–1927), South Australian racehorse owner and breeder
Fred Allen (footballer) (1860–c. 1926), English footballer
Fred Allen (athlete) (1890–1964), American track and field athlete
Fred Allen (rugby union) (1920–2012), rugby player and coach from New Zealand
Fred Allen (cricketer) (born 1935), English cricketer

Others
Fred Hovey Allen (1845–1926), American theologian
Frederick Madison Allen (1879–1964), American doctor who treated diabetes
Frederick Lewis Allen (1890–1954), American magazine editor and historian

See also
Allen (surname)